Darrell Ourso is an American politician. He served as a Republican member for the 66th district of the Louisiana House of Representatives.

In 2015, Ourso won the 66th district of the Louisiana House of Representatives, running against Buddy Amoroso and Rick Bond. He succeeded Hunter Greene. In 2016, Ourso was succeeded by Rick Edmonds after losing his bid for re-election. He also served as a member of the Baton Rouge Metro Council from 1999 to 2008.

References 

Living people
Place of birth missing (living people)
Year of birth missing (living people)
Republican Party members of the Louisiana House of Representatives
21st-century American politicians